"It’s So Hard" is the first posthumous single by Puerto Rican-American rapper Big Pun, from his 2000 second studio album, Yeeeah Baby. It features singer Donell Jones and was produced by Younglord and Jay "Waxx" Garfield, and was released following his sudden death two months prior.

The song peaked at number 75 on the Billboard Hot 100 and at number 19 on the Billboard Hot R&B/Hip-Hop Songs chart.

Music video
The music video of the song (directed by Chris Robinson) features cameo appearances from Alexis Fields, LL Cool J, Busta Rhymes, Spliff Star, Xzibit, Mack 10, P. Diddy, Nas, DJ Clue?, Wyclef Jean, Prodigy, Raekwon, Method Man, Smooth B, DJ Funkmaster Flex, The Beatnuts, Chino XL, DJ Premier, Tash, Big Tigger, Cuban Link, Prospect, Triple Seis, Armageddon, Sunkiss, Tony Sunshine, Tony Touch, Mexicano 777, Fat Joe, Lil' Kim, Lil' Cease, M.O.P., Missy Elliott, Noreaga, Jennifer Lopez, Black Rob, Busta Rhymes, Sean Price and a then-unknown DJ Khaled.

References
 []

2000 singles
Big Pun songs
Donell Jones songs
Music videos directed by Chris Robinson (director)
2000 songs
Songs written by Big Pun